Edmund Murray may refer to:

Edmund Murray (priest) (1877–1969), Archdeacon of Cheltenham
Edmund P. Murray (1930–2007), American writer

See also
Edmund Murray Dodd (1797–1876), lawyer, judge and political figure in Nova Scotia